The 2016–17 Clemson Tigers women's basketball team represented Clemson University during the 2016–17 college basketball season. The Tigers were led by fourth-year head coach Audra Smith. The Tigers, members of the Atlantic Coast Conference, played their home games at Littlejohn Coliseum after a one year of renovation. They finished the season 15–16, 3–13 in ACC play to finish in a tie for thirteenth place. They advance to the second round of ACC women's tournament where they lost to Louisville.

Roster

Schedule

|-
!colspan=9 style="background:#522D80; color:#F66733;"| Exhibition

|-
!colspan=9 style="background:#522D80; color:#F66733;"| Non-conference regular season

|-
!colspan=9 style="background:#522D80; color:#F66733;"| ACC regular season

|-
!colspan=9 style="background:#522D80; color:#F66733;"| ACC Women's Tournament

Rankings
2016–17 NCAA Division I women's basketball rankings

See also
 2016–17 Clemson Tigers men's basketball team

References

Clemson Tigers women's basketball seasons
Clemson
Clemson Tig
Clemson Tig